This article refers to Langtry, Roberta. For other people, see Langtry (surname).

Roberta Langtry (1916 – August 13, 2005), a Canadian anonymous philanthropist, was a modestly-paid Toronto elementary school teacher and a multimillionaire. Upon her death she bequeathed more than C$4.3-million (equivalent to £2 million / US$3.8 million at then-current exchange rates) of her estate to the Nature Conservancy of Canada, a charity that buys environmentally sensitive land and turns it into nature reserves. She had been a modest supporter of NCC's work since 1999.

While she was alive, she made a number of large, anonymous gifts to individuals she knew who were in need. Recipients would receive envelopes from an unknown benefactor in the amounts of $25,000 or $30,000. Her friends and coworkers were unaware of her wealth.

Langtry was born in Manitoba. She began teaching around the age of 16. Most of her 55 years as a teacher and speech therapist were with the East York Board of Education. She never married and had no children. Langtry lived in her aunt's modest bungalow, sharing it with her aunt until she died in the early 1990s and living alone until she died herself.

Sources of wealth 
Langtry may have earned a modest side-income via her development of a number of puzzle-based educational games, that were sold in the United States. In 1960, she co-authored Teacher's guide to accompany Creative English, grade four with J.D. Hanmer (Vancouver : Copp Clark Pub. Co.).

References 
Nature Conservancy of Canada Receives Largest Bequest Ever Made for Conservation in Canada. Retrieved on September 29, 2006. 
School teacher leaves millions to charity. Retrieved on September 29, 2006.
Canadian Textbooks. Retrieved on September 29, 2006.

External links 
Nature Conservancy of Canada

1916 births
2005 deaths
People from Toronto
People from Pembina Valley Region, Manitoba
Canadian philanthropists
Speech and language pathologists
Canadian women philanthropists
20th-century philanthropists
20th-century women philanthropists